To the Confusion of Our Enemies is an album by American punk band the Riverboat Gamblers. It was released in 2006 on Volcom Entertainment.

Track list

References

2006 albums
The Riverboat Gamblers albums
Volcom Entertainment albums
No Idea Records albums